A granule is a convection cell in the Sun's photosphere. They are caused by convection currents of plasma in the Sun's convective zone, directly below the photosphere. The grainy appearance of the solar photosphere is produced by the tops of these convective cells and is called granulation.

The rising part of the granules is located in the center where the plasma is hotter. The outer edge of the granules is darker due to the cooler descending plasma. (The terms darker and cooler are strictly by comparison to the brighter, hotter plasma. According to the Stefan–Boltzmann law, luminosity increases with the fourth power of temperature leading to even a small loss of heat producing a large luminosity contrast.) In addition to the visible appearance, which would be explained by convective motion, Doppler shift measurements of the light from individual granules provides evidence for the convective nature of the granules.

At any one time, the Sun's surface is covered by about 4 million granules.

Gallery

References

External links

Sun
Solar phenomena